The Lisa Leslie Award is an award presented annually to the best women's basketball center in the National Collegiate Athletic Association (NCAA) Division I competition. It is named after Hall of Famer Lisa Leslie, an eight-time All Star and two-time champion of the WNBA in her 12 years career with the LA Sparks. In 2002, Leslie became the first player to dunk in a WNBA game, en route to a second championship for the Sparks. Leslie retired as the WNBA all-time leading scorer & rebounder and is a four-time Olympic gold medalist.

The Lisa Leslie Award was first presented in 2018, when WBCA and the Naismith Hall, in collaboration with ESPN, incorporated the previously existing Nancy Lieberman Award, presented to the top NCAA women's point guard, into a new set of awards known as the "Naismith Starting Five", that are presented at the WBCA convention (except in 2020, when the convention was not held due to the coronavirus pandemic) to players at each of the five traditional basketball positions. These awards parallel a previously existing set of men's basketball positional awards also presented by the Hall. In addition to the Lieberman Award, first presented in 2000, the other three new awards are:
 Ann Meyers Drysdale Shooting Guard Award
 Katrina McClain Power Forward Award
 Cheryl Miller Small Forward Award

Winner for each of the Starting Five awards is determined by a selection committee consisting of Hall of Famers, WBCA coaching members, and media, and headed by the award's namesake. Fan voting through the Hall's website is also incorporated into the selection process.

Key

Winners

Winners by school

See also
Kareem Abdul-Jabbar Award – the counterpart to the Leslie Award; given to the best men's NCAA center

References

External links
Official website

College basketball player of the year awards in the United States
College basketball trophies and awards in the United States
College women's basketball in the United States
Sports awards honoring women
Awards established in 2018
College sports trophies and awards in the United States